Aloidendron ramosissimum, formerly Aloe ramosissima, is a species of flowering plant in the family Asphodelaceae. It is endemic to the Richtersveld at the border between South Africa and Namibia, where it grows on desert slopes and in ravines. Its common name is maiden's quiver tree.

Its habitat may be threatened by mining and overgrazing.

It is similar to Aloidendron dichotomum, but bushier and shorter in stature, rarely exceeding 60 centimeters in height. It might not be a distinct species; it has been treated as a variety and a subspecies of A. dichotomum.

Gallery

References

Asphodeloideae
Vulnerable plants
Flora of Namibia
Flora of the Cape Provinces
Taxonomy articles created by Polbot